Doosan Engineering & Construction is a South Korean general construction company. Since its inception in 1960, the Company has engaged in the construction of infrastructure facilities, including roads, railroads, bridges, ports, buildings and residential facilities.

History 
In 2006, Doosan Engineering & Construction acquires Mitsui Babcock Energy, a UK based boiler design and engineering company, for $169.5 million US dollars.

In 2019, Doosan Engineering and Construction is announced to be delisted from the stock market after becoming an affiliate of Doosan Heavy Industries & Construction.

On June 15, 2020, Doosan Engineering and Construction looks to separate from the Doosan Group as it tries to find a buyer. Doosan E&C reported it is spinning off some assets and liabilities to Valuegrowth Corporation and will own 69.5% of Valuegrowth's common stock.

Major activities

Civil works

The Company handles design, implementation, maintenance and repair for all types of civil engineering, including expressways, subways, roads, bridges, industrial and residential complex construction, reclamation, and port construction.

Plant

The Company has track records throughout diverse fields of the plant engineering business, including energy, industrial and environmental plants. It has constructed facilities such as low-temperature liquefied gas storage tanks and gas processing plants not only in Korea but also in many parts of the world, most recently the Madagascar ammonia terminal project.

Building works

Brand
Doosan We’ve, Doosan Engineering & Construction's residential apartment brand, was created in 2001.

Business areas
Civil Works
 Road/Highways
 Railways/Subways
 Bridges/Tunnels
 Ports/Reclaim/Water Works and Sewerage
 Privately Funded SOC Business
Architecture
 Work Facilities
 Training/R&D/Production Facilities
 Cultural/Meeting/Physical Fitness Facilities
 Leisure/Hotel/Commercial Facilities
 Public/Medical Facilities
 Electrical Works
 Remodeling
Housing
 Rebuilding
 Redevelopment
 In-house Development
 Housing Developments
 Contracted Projects
Plant
 Environmental Plant
 Hydrocarbon/Energy Plant
 Industrial Plant
CPE (Chemical Process Equipment)
 Tower/Column
 Reactor
 Heat Exchanger
 Pressure Vessel
 Miscellaneous
Steel Bridge
 general bridges
 suspension bridges
 truss bridges
 cable-stayed bridges

References

External links
 Doosan Engineering & Construction English Web Site

Construction and civil engineering companies of South Korea
Companies listed on the Korea Exchange
Construction and civil engineering companies established in 1960
South Korean companies established in 1960